The 2020 J&T Banka Ostrava Open is a WTA tournament organised for female professional tennis players, held in Ostrava, Czech Republic, in mid-October 2020 on indoor hard courts. It was primarily organised due to the cancellation of many tournaments during the 2020 season, because of the ongoing COVID-19 pandemic. The tournament attracted four top-20 players, including two-time grand slam champion and former world no. 1 Victoria Azarenka.

Singles main draw entrants

Seeds

 Rankings are as of October 12, 2020.

Other entrants
The following players received wildcards into the singles main draw:
  Jeļena Ostapenko 
  Kristýna Plíšková
  Kateřina Siniaková

The following players received entry from the qualifying draw:
  Coco Gauff
  Daria Kasatkina
  Barbora Krejčíková
  Veronika Kudermetova
  Tereza Martincová
  Sara Sorribes Tormo

Withdrawals
Before the tournament
  Kiki Bertens → replaced by  Amanda Anisimova
  Sofia Kenin → replaced by  Ekaterina Alexandrova
  Angelique Kerber → replaced by  Karolína Muchová
  Madison Keys → replaced by  Donna Vekić
  Johanna Konta → replaced by  Ons Jabeur
  Petra Kvitová → replaced by  Magda Linette
  Garbiñe Muguruza → replaced by  Dayana Yastremska
  Alison Riske → replaced by  Jennifer Brady
  Markéta Vondroušová → replaced by  Barbora Strýcová

Doubles main draw entrants

Seeds 

 1 Rankings as of October 12, 2020.

Other entrants 
The following pair received a wildcard into the doubles main draw:
  Jesika Malečková /  Chantal Škamlová

Withdrawals
During the tournament
  Anna Blinkova
  Barbora Krejčíková

Finals
All dates and times are CEST (UTC+2) to 24 October and CET (UTC+1) from 25 October

Singles

  Aryna Sabalenka def.  Victoria Azarenka, 6–2, 6–2.
It was Sabalenka's 7th WTA singles title, and second of the year. This was the first WTA singles final in history to be completed between two Belarusian players.

Doubles

  Elise Mertens /  Aryna Sabalenka def.  Gabriela Dabrowski /  Luisa Stefani, 6–1, 6–3.

This was Mertens' 10th WTA doubles title, and first of the year, and was Sabalenka's 4th WTA doubles title, and first of the year. This was their 4th WTA doubles title as a pair.

References

External links
Official website
WTA website

Ostrava Open
Ostrava Open
Ostrava Open
Ostrava Open